Frederick William Baller (21 November 1852 – 12 August 1922) was a British Protestant Christian missionary to China, Chinese linguist, translator, educator and sinologist.

Missionary career
Following his conversion to Christianity at age 17, Baller was one of the first students of the Missionary Institute established in the East End of London by Henry Grattan Guinness.

Baller applied to the China Inland Mission and left England on 3 September 1873 with Charles Henry Judd, M. Henry Taylor, and Mary Bowyer. They arrived at Shanghai on 5 November 1873. The following year, he and Mary Bowyer were married at Shanghai, on 17 September. Mary was a veteran missionary to China who had ventured out with Hudson Taylor on the Lammermuir (clipper) in 1866, at the beginning of the China Inland Mission. She had been baptised by Taylor, along with some others, en route at the Sunda Strait.

Baller studied the Chinese language in Nanking (Nanjing), then just recently liberated from the ravages of the Taiping rebels. Baller was then appointed superintendent of missions in Anhui and Jiangsu with the China Inland Mission. He went to Shanxi in 1876, with George King, to distribute famine relief. Due to the continued famine in 1878, he returned to Shanxi with Taylor's wife Jane Elizabeth Faulding and single women missionaries Horne and Crickmay.  Baller took a China Inland Mission party through Hunan, facing antiforeign opposition, to Guiyang in 1880, visiting the capital of Guizhou. He was appointed secretary to the first China Inland Mission China Council in 1885.

Writing and teaching career
In 1896, he was appointed principal of the new training home for CIM male missionaries at Anqing, Sichuan. There he not only helped train missionaries in the Chinese language but also published his lectures in Letters, from an Old Missionary to His Nephew (1907).

In 1897, he began his extensive literary work. From 1900 to 1918 he served on the committee to revise the Mandarin Bible as a member of the Union Mandarin Bible Revision Committee at Beijing, for the New Testament in 1907, and the Old Testament 1907–1918. Among his many books, the best known are An Anglo-Chinese Dictionary, The Mandarin Primer (at least 14 editions), An Idiom a Lesson, An Analytical Vocabulary of the New Testament, Lessons in Wenli, An English Translation of the Sacred Edict, and The Life of Hudson Taylor.

After the death of his first wife, Baller married H. B. Fleming on 23 January 1912.

Due to his work with the Chinese language, in 1915 he was made a Life Governor of the British and Foreign Bible Society; he was also a vice-president of the National Bible Society of Scotland; and a Life Member of the American Bible Society.

In 1919, Baller went on furlough after nineteen years of uninterrupted service in China.

Baller died in 1922 and was buried in Shanghai shortly after completing his book on Taylor.

Works authored or translated
 
 
 
 
 
 Life of C. H. Spurgeon Translated into Mandarin
 A Retrospect by J. Hudson Taylor (translated into Chinese)
 An analytical Chinese-English dictionary : compiled for the China Inland Mission (1900)
 'An analytical vocabulary of the New Testament (1907)
 A Mandarin primer (1911)
 An idiom a lesson; a short course in elementary Chinese (1921)
(Harvard University)
(Harvard University)
(Princeton University)
(Columbia University)
(the University of California)
()
(the University of Michigan)

Bibliography

Further reading 
Historical Bibliography of the China Inland Mission

External links
OMF International (formerly China Inland Mission and Overseas Missionary Fellowship)

References

English Protestant missionaries
Protestant missionaries in China
British expatriates in China
Translators of the Bible into Chinese
Protestant writers
British sinologists
British lexicographers
1852 births
1922 deaths
Burials in Shanghai
Missionary linguists